William Henry Harrison Murray (1840–1904), also known as Adirondack Murray, was an American clergyman and author of an influential series of articles and books which popularized the Adirondack Mountains in Upstate New York. He became known as the father of the Outdoor Movement.

Born in Guilford, Connecticut, he graduated from Yale in 1862 and then served as a minister in Greenwich, Connecticut and Meriden, Connecticut. He also served as pastor of Park Street Church in Boston from 1868 to 1874. He also delivered Sunday evening lectures about the Adirondacks in a Boston music-hall that proved highly popular, and he published a series of articles based on the lectures in a Meriden newspaper. In 1869, they were published as a book, Adventures in the Wilderness; or, Camp-Life in the Adirondacks.

The literary tone of the book made it extremely successful; it went through eight printings in its first year. Murray promoted New York's north woods as health-giving and spirit-enhancing, claiming that the rustic nobility typical of Adirondack woodsmen came from their intimacy with wilderness. A subsequent printing, subtitled Tourist's Edition, included maps of the region and train schedules from various Eastern cities to the Adirondacks.

Although the book was to become one of the most influential books in the conservation movement of the 19th century, paradoxically, within five years it led to the building of over 200 "Great Camps" in the Adirondacks; "Murray’s Fools" poured into the wilderness each weekend, packing specially scheduled railroad trains. The book is cited as changing common parlance to use "vacation" instead of the British "holiday" for people vacating their city homes.

Publications
Camp Life in the Adirondacks (Boston, 1868)
Music-Hall Sermons (1870–1873)
Park Street pulpit: Sermons by William H.H. Murray (1871)
Words Fitly Spoken (1873)
The Perfect Horse (1873)
Sermons delivered from Park Street Pulpit (1874)
Deacons (1875)
The Golden Rule An Illustrated Family Magazine Edited and Published by W.H.H Murray (1874-1879)
Adirondack Tales (1877)
How Deacon Tubman and Parson Whitney kept New Year, and other Stories (1887)
Daylight Land (1888)
The Story of The Keg and The Man Who Didn't Know Much (1889)
Sermons, lectures, and addresses (1898)

References

Sources
Jerome, Christine Adirondack Passage: Cruise of Canoe Sairy Gamp, HarperCollins, 1994.

External links
 Full text of Camp Life in the Adirondacks
 
 
 
 
 Works by Murray at Google Books
 

1840 births
1904 deaths
American environmentalists
American sportswriters
People from Guilford, Connecticut
Yale University alumni
American Christian clergy
19th-century Christian clergy
19th-century American clergy